Aputrechisibus dubius is a species of beetle in the family Carabidae, the only species in the genus Aputrechisibus.

References

Trechinae